Maltese architecture has its origins in prehistory, and some of the oldest free-standing structures on Earth – a series of megalithic temples – can be found on Malta. The islands were colonized by the Phoenicians and later the Romans, who established the cities of Melite and Gaulos. Although these were substantial settlements and are known to have had numerous temples, churches and palaces, few remains have survived apart from some architectural fragments.

After the fall of the Western Roman Empire, Malta became part of the Byzantine Empire, before falling to the Arabs in 870. Virtually no examples of Byzantine or Arab architecture have survived, although the Arabs left a significant influence on Maltese vernacular architecture which remained popular in subsequent centuries. Malta became part of the County and later the Kingdom of Sicily in 1091, and Norman architecture and other European styles were introduced to the island. Relatively few examples of medieval architecture have survived, including a few buildings in Mdina and the Cittadella, as well as several chapels in the Maltese countryside.

Maltese architecture flourished while the islands were under the rule of the Order of St. John from 1530 to 1798. The Hospitallers introduced Renaissance architecture to Malta in the mid-16th century, with the Baroque style becoming popular about a century later. The two and a half centuries of Hospitaller rule saw the establishment of new settlements (most notably the capital Valletta) and the construction of many churches, palaces and public buildings. The Order also built bastioned fortifications around the main cities, apart from a series of coastal and inland defences.

After Malta became part of the British Empire in 1800, Neoclassical and Neo-Gothic architecture were introduced, and they were the predominant styles of the 19th century. Several styles left an influence on Maltese architecture in the first half of the 20th century, including Art Nouveau, Art Deco, Italian futurism, rationalism and modernism. Malta experienced a building boom after World War II, which increased after independence in 1964. The modernist style remained popular, but new styles such as critical regionalism were also introduced.

Prehistoric architecture 

The Ġgantija temples (two sites) were listed as a UNESCO World Heritage Site in 1980. In 1992, the UNESCO Committee further extended the existing listing to include five other megalithic temple sites. These are Ħaġar Qim (in Qrendi), Mnajdra (in Qrendi), Ta' Ħaġrat Temples (in Mġarr), Skorba Temples (in Żebbiegħ) and Tarxien Temples (in Tarxien). Nowadays, the sites are managed by Heritage Malta, while ownership of the surrounding lands varies from site to site. Apart from these, there are other megalithic temples in Malta which are not included in the UNESCO World Heritage list.

Roman architecture 

The Domvs Romana (Latin for "Roman House"), is a ruined Roman-era house located on the boundary between Mdina and Rabat, Malta. It was built in the 1st century BC as an aristocratic town house (domus) within the Roman city of Melite.

Arab architecture

Medieval architecture 

 Annunciation Chapel, Victoria
 Chapel of San Mikiel Is-Sanċir
 Chapel of St Basil, Mqabba
 Chapel of the Annunciation, Żurrieq
 Cittadella (Gozo)
 Our Saviour's Chapel, Żejtun
 Palazzo Falson
 St. Catherine's Old Church, Żejtun
 St Matthew's Chapel (Iż-Żgħir)
 Santa Cecilia Chapel
 St Bartholomew's Chapel, Rabat
 St Mary Magdalene Chapel, Dingli
 St Mary's Chapel, Bir Miftuħ
 Tal-Virtù Church

Maltese Baroque architecture 

The Maltese Baroque is the form of Baroque architecture that developed in Malta during the 17th and 18th centuries, when the islands were under the rule of the Order of St. John. The Baroque style was introduced in Malta in the early 17th century, possibly by the Bolognese engineer Bontadino de Bontadini during the construction of the Wignacourt Aqueduct. The style became popular in the mid to late 17th century, and it reached its peak during the 18th century, when monumental Baroque structures such as Auberge de Castille were constructed.

The Baroque style began to be replaced by neoclassical architecture and other styles in the early 19th century, when Malta was under British rule. Despite this, Baroque elements continued to influence traditional Maltese architecture. Many churches continued to the built in the Baroque style throughout the 19th and 20th centuries, and to a lesser extent in the 21st century.

 Admiralty House (Valletta)
 Palazzo Nasciaro
 Corte Capitanale, Mdina (French Baroque)
 Vilhena Palace, Mdina (French Baroque)
 Banca Giuratale (Mdina)

19th century architecture

Victorian architecture 

 Is-Suq tal-Belt
 Zammitello Palace
 Valletta's Kingsgate, 1853

Neoclassical architecture

Neoclassical architecture was introduced in Malta in the late 18th century, during the final years of Hospitaller rule. Early examples include the Bibliotheca (1786), the De Rohan Arch (1798) and the Hompesch Gate (1801). However, neoclassical architecture only became popular in Malta following the establishment of British rule in the early 19th century. In 1814, a neoclassical portico decorated with the British coat of arms was added to the Main Guard building so as to serve as a symbol of British Malta. Other 19th century neoclassical buildings include the Monument to Sir Alexander Ball (1810), RNH Bighi (1832), St Paul's Pro-Cathedral (1844), the Rotunda of Mosta (1860) and the now-destroyed Royal Opera House (1866).

Neoclassicism gave way to other architectural styles by the late 19th century. Few buildings were built in the neoclassical style during the 20th century, such as the Domvs Romana museum (1922), and the Courts of Justice building in Valletta (1965–71).

 La Borsa

Romanesque Revival architecture 

 Lady Rachel Hamilton-Gordon Memorial Chapel
 Santa Venera Parish Church
 Ta' Pinu

Gothic Revival architecture 

 Addolorata Cemetery, Paola
 Palazzo Ferreria
 Sliema Point Battery
 Villa St Ignatius
 Carmelite Church, Balluta
 Church of the Holy Trinity, Sliema
 Lady Rachel Hamilton-Gordon Memorial Chapel
 Our Lady of Loreto Parish Church
 Parish Church of St. Cajetan, Ħamrun
 Robert Samut Hall
 St. Andrew's Scots Church, Malta
 Casa Gourgion

Neo-Renaissance 

 Aedes Danielis
 Old University Building, Valletta
 Parish Church of Our Lady of Graces, Żabbar
 Parish Church of St. Mary, Attard
 Parish Church of St. Mary, Birkirkara
 St. Catherine's Old Church, Żejtun
 Sanctuary of Our Lady of Mellieħa
 Verdala Palace

Moorish Revival architecture 

 Turkish Military Cemetery by Emanuele Luigi Galizia (1830-1907)
 Villa Alhambra, Sliema by Emanuele Luigi Galizia (1830-1907)

Eclecticism 
 Casino Notabile, Saqqajja, by Webster Paulson (Beaux-Arts architecture), 1888

20th century architecture

Art Nouveau / Art Deco architecture

Modernist architecture 

 Joseph G. Huntingford

Contemporary architecture 

 The Barrakka Lift - Architect: Architecture Project Valletta
 St James Cavalier Centre for Creativity - Architect: Richard England
 DB House - Architect: Forward Architects
 Strait Street Public Toilets - Architect: Chris Briffa Architects
 House of Four Winds (Bank of Valletta, Chairperson’s Office) - Architect: DeMicoli & Associates Architects
 New Parliament Building by Renzo Piano

Notable Maltese architects

See also
 Gozo Farmhouse

References 

 

Malta